Héctor Mario López Fuentes (7 May 1930 – 18 October 2015)  was a Guatemalan general. He served as Army Chief of Staff until his replacement in 1983 by Rodolfo Lobos Zamora.

In July 2011, López Fuentes was arrested on charges of genocide and crimes against humanity for his links to the killings of more than 300 Mayan civilians in the Ixil region during the administration of President Efrain Rios Montt.

At the time, López Fuentes was suffering from terminal cancer, and a hearing originally scheduled for October 2011 had to be delayed due to his condition. In May 2012, he was brought before Judge Miguel Ángel Gálvez of Tribunal B de Mayor Riesgo to face the charges. Gálvez rejected a motion by López' lawyer Moisés Galindo to close the tribunal on the grounds of López Fuentes' poor health. The retrial had  been scheduled for January 2016 but López Fuentes died on 18 October 2015, aged 85.

References

1930 births
2015 deaths
Guatemalan military personnel